Denis may refer to:

People
 Saint Denis of Paris, 3rd-century Christian martyr and first bishop of Paris
 Denis the Areopagite, Biblical figure
 Denis, son of Ampud (died 1236), baron in the Kingdom of Hungary
 Denis the Carthusian (1402–1471), theologian and mystic
 Denis of Hungary (c. 1210–1272), Hungarian-born Aragonese knight
 Denis of Portugal (1261–1325), king of Portugal
 Denis, Lord of Cifuentes (1354–1397)
 Denis the Little (c. 470 – c. 544), Scythian monk
 Denis Handlin (born 1951), Australian entrepreneur and business executive
 Denis, Palatine of Hungary, lord in the Kingdom of Hungary
 Denis (harpsichord makers), French harpsichord makers
 Denis Perera (1930-2013), general, Commander of the Sri Lanka Army from 1977-1981
 Louis Juchereau de St. Denis (1676–1744), French-Canadian explorer of French Louisiana and Spanish Texas
 Denis Villeneuve (born 1967), Canadian filmmaker

Other uses
 Denis (given name)
 Denis (surname)
 "Denis" (song), a song by Blondie
 Denis (album), a 1996 album by Blondie
 DENIS: Deep Near Infrared Survey of the Southern Sky, an astronomical survey

See also
 Dennis
 Jean-Denis
 Saint Denis (disambiguation)
 Battle of Saint-Denis (disambiguation), several battles
 Paul Denis (disambiguation)
 Dennis, a name (includes a list of people with the name)
 Dennis (disambiguation)
 Denis's Ear, a cave in Italy